Templet is a mountain north of Sassenfjorden, at the south side of Bünsow Land at Spitsbergen, Svalbard. Its height is 766 metre. The name Templet stems from its resemblance to a ruined Gothic cathedral, consisting of eroded horizontal layers of shales, silicates and limestones. 

The mountain lies within the Sassen – Bünsow Land National Park, and is regarded as a tourist attraction.

References

Mountains of Spitsbergen